Antonio Kenneth Anderson (born June 4, 1973) is a former American professional football defensive lineman in the National Football League (NFL) for the Dallas Cowboys. He also was a member of the Memphis Maniax in the XFL. He played college football at Syracuse University.

Early years
Anderson attended Midwood High School, where he was a two-way player at defensive tackle and offensive tackle. He transferred to Milford Academy, where he focused on playing defensive tackle. 

As a senior, he registered 90 tackles (30 for loss), 13 sacks, and 3 blocked punts, while receiving Super Prep Al-American and All-Northeast honors.

College career
Anderson accepted a football scholarship from Syracuse University. As a redshirt freshman, he played in every game (3 starts) at defensive tackle, registering 13 tackles, one sack and one quarterback pressure. He had 2 tackles and one sack in the season opener against Ball State University. He made 4 tackles (one for loss) against the University of Pittsburgh.

As a sophomore reserve left defensive tackle, he made 17 tackles (2 for loss), one sack and 4 quarterback pressures. He had 5 tackles, one sack and one quarterback pressure against Virginia Tech University. He had 4 tackles (one for loss), one quarterback pressures and one fumble recovery against Temple University.

As a junior, he started 6 games at left defensive tackle and 2 contests at right defensive tackle, posting 42 tackles (3 for loss), 8 quarterback pressures (led team), 3.5 sacks, 2 fumble recoveries and one pass defensed. He had 4 tackles and one fumble recovery against Rutgers University. He tallied 6 tackles against West Virginia University. He made 5 tackles and 2 quarterback pressures against Virginia Tech University. He had 7 tackles (one for loss) against the University of Pittsburgh. He made 2.5 sacks against Boston College.

As a senior, he started all of the games, recording 45 tackles (9 for loss), 4 sacks, 27 quarterback pressures, 2 passes defensed and 3 forced fumbles. He had 6 tackles, half a sack and 4 quarterback pressures in the season opener against the University of North Carolina. He collected 6 tackles, 4 quarterback pressures, one sack and one forced fumble against Virginia Tech University. He had 7 tackles and 2 sacks against Boston College. He tallied 5 tackles (one for loss) and 7 quarterback pressures against Army.

Professional career

Dallas Cowboys
Anderson was selected by the Dallas Cowboys in the fourth round (101st pick overall) of the 1997 NFL Draft, after dropping because his physical skills didn't match his on-field production. As a rookie, he registered 40 tackles (2 for loss), 2 sacks, 3 quarterback pressures and 2 passes defensed. He started five games and received NFL All-rookie team honors. 

He had 7 tackles in the third game against the Philadelphia Eagles, starting in place of an injured Chad Hennings. He collected 2 tackles, one quarterback pressure and one pass defensed against the Chicago Bears. He made 4 tackles and one sack against the Jacksonville Jaguars. He had 6 tackles in the eighth game against the Philadelphia Eagles. He totaled 5 tackles against the San Francisco 49ers.

In 1998, he was limited to only five games and 5 tackles (one for loss) due to a right knee injury, eventually falling out of the defensive line rotation. He was left unprotected for the 1999 NFL Expansion Draft.

Cleveland Browns
The Browns selected him in the 1999 NFL Expansion Draft. He was released on April 22.

Carolina Panthers
On June 24, 1999, he signed with the Carolina Panthers. He was released before the season started on July 21.

Memphis Maniax (XFL)
In 2001, Anderson joined the Memphis Maniax of the XFL. He was a backup defensive tackle and registered 4 tackles. The league ceased operations in May 2001.

Personal life
Anderson was a defensive assistant coach at Hempstead High School. He was a defensive line coach with the Rhein Fire in NFL Europe. He was a defensive assistant at the Merchant Marine Academy. He was a defensive line coach at Nassau Community College. He is currently a defensive line coach and recruiting coordinator at ASA College in New York.

He is one of 14 children. He has 3 cousins that played professional sports: Stanford Jennings (NFL), Keith Jennings (NFL) and John Salley (NBA).

References

External links
Memphis Maniax  bio

1973 births
Living people
Sportspeople from Brooklyn
Players of American football from New York City
American football defensive ends
American football defensive tackles
Midwood High School alumni
Syracuse Orange football players
Dallas Cowboys players
Memphis Maniax players
Rhein Fire coaches
High school football coaches in New York (state)